The Ranger Uranium Mine was a uranium mine in the Northern Territory of Australia. The site is surrounded by, but separate from Kakadu National Park, 230 km east of Darwin. The orebody was discovered in late 1969, and the mine commenced operation in 1980, reaching full production of uranium oxide in 1981 and ceased stockpile processing on 8 January 2021. Mining activities had ceased in 2012. It is owned and operated by Energy Resources of Australia (ERA), a public company 86.33% owned by Rio Tinto Group, the remainder held by the public. Uranium mined at Ranger was sold for use in nuclear power stations in Japan, South Korea, China, UK, France, Germany, Spain, Sweden and the United States.

The original Ranger 1 orebody was mined out by the end of 1995, although some ore remained stockpiled. A second orebody, Ranger 3, began mining in 1997. Both were open-pit mines. Mining finished at Ranger in late 2012 and the mine plant processed stockpiled ore until January 2021. ERA has tenure and access to the site, principally for rehabilitation activities, until 8 January 2026.

Discovery

The Ranger uranium orebody, the richest in the southern hemisphere, was discovered in late 1969, when an aerial radiometric survey conducted by Geophysical Resources Development Co., a company based in Sydney, on contract to Noranda Aluminum, detected a large spike in gamma radiation when passing over Mount Brockman, known as Djidbidjidbi to the Mirarr traditional owners of the area. The instrument that detected the anomaly was a Nuclear Enterprises gamma ray spectrometer using a Thallium doped Sodium Iodide cylindrical crystal. The anomaly could still be detected at almost . The crew members on board were Bill Hay, the pilot, Harvey Morton, the navigator and Frank Lanza, the instruments operator, who first recognised the significance of the anomaly.

The Ranger Uranium Environmental Inquiry
In 1975, Gough Whitlam appointed Justice Russell Fox, a judge of the Supreme Court of the Australian Capital Territory, to lead an inquiry into the environmental dangers posed by mining uranium in the Northern Territory and the associated risks of exporting it, including those of nuclear proliferation. The inquiry produced two reports, published in 1976 and 1977.

The ore bodies
The Ranger No. 1 and Ranger No. 3 ore bodies occur in the Cahill Formation, consisting of Lower Proterozoic metasediments, located in the Alligator Rivers Uranium Field. The mine commenced operation in 1980, reaching full production of uranium oxide in 1981.  Owing to the environmental sensitivity of the site, a special statutory authority, the Supervising Scientist, was created to provide oversight of the operation and conduct environmental research in the region.

Ranger mine covers two of a line of uranium orebodies that extend from near Nourlangie Rock in Kakadu north-eastwards to Koongarra, underneath Mount Brockman, then northwards through the Ranger One line of orebodies (in order Number 2, Number 1, and Number 3), then via Hades Flat, where there is uranium mineralisation, to Jabiluka where the line turns westward through the Barote and Ranger 4 orebodies. The mine covers No 1 Orebody and No 3 Orebody. No 2 orebody was excluded from the mining lease at the request of the traditional owners and included in Kakadu National Park. From Ranger 4 the line again turns northwards and then swings westward round an Archaean basement dome before turning south towards Nourlangie Rock again. Uranium mineralisation is known at several other places along this line but has never been explored in detail because of the creation of Kakadu. The name 'Ranger' for the series of discoveries made by Geopeko, the exploration arm of Peko-Wallsend, in the period 1969 to 1972, was thought up by Judy Ryan, the wife of the geologist in charge of the program. Koongarra and Jabiluka were retained by the companies that found them: Noranda Australia and Pancontinental Mining respectively, although since sold to other parties. The other discoveries were enclosed in the National Park.

ERA was named Explorer of the Year at the sixth annual Australian Mining Prospect Awards held in Sydney in November 2009. During 2008, ERA's exploration programme identified a significant mineral resource adjacent to the operating Ranger 3 pit. The area, known as Ranger 3 Deeps, ranked among the world's most significant new uranium discoveries of recent years.

Ranger 3 Deeps
ERA constructed a $120 million Ranger 3 Deeps exploration decline to conduct close spaced underground exploration drilling and explore areas adjacent to the Ranger 3 Deeps resource.

In parallel with the construction of the exploration decline, ERA began a $57 million project to prepare a Prefeasibility Study into the potential development of a Ranger 3 Deeps underground mine.  This Study will determine the economic viability of the project, optimise mining methods, and confirm metallurgical performance and production rates. Environmental studies will also be conducted.  ERA will also consult further with the Gundjeihmi Aboriginal Corporation as a component of a broader social impact assessment.

ERA formally commenced the statutory approval process for the proposed Ranger 3 Deeps underground mine with the submission of a referral to the Commonwealth Department of Sustainability, Environment, Water Population and Communities under the Environmental Protection and Biodiversity Control Act 1999 in January 2013. At the same time, ERA separately lodged a notice of intent with the Northern Territory Environment Protection Authority under the Northern Territory Environmental Assessment Act.

Ore processing 
Ore is crushed, ground, then leached with sulphuric acid. Uranium is removed using kerosene with amine then stripped with ammonium sulphate solution and gaseous ammonia. Ammonium diuranate is precipitated by increasing the pregnant solution pH, and converted to uranium oxide (U3O8) in a furnace.

In early 2006, ERA announced an expansion to the processing plant which would allow production to extend into lower-grade ore and in November 2006 the company announced plans to invest in a laterite processing plant, which would allow it to process ore with a high clay content that has been stockpiled since the mine began operating. This ore had been already included in stated reserves. The laterite processing plant would contribute 400 tonnes of uranium oxide per year from 2008 until 2014.

Water management 
Water management is a critical component of ERA's business, and between 2009 and 2012, ERA completed water management projects for a total cost of $82 million. This included surface water interception trenches around stockpiles to protect local waterways, installation of continuous real-time monitoring stations, and additional ground water bores to augment the extensive ground water monitoring programme.

In addition, ERA completed a 2.3-metre life of the Tailings Storage Facility, constructed a new pond water retention pond to store up to one gigalitre of pond water, and installed contingency water pumping system between the Tailings Storage Facility and Pit 3.
From 2012 to 2014, ERA expects to expend a total of $316 million in various water management projects including the $220 million Brine Concentrator Project. Brine Concentrators use thermal energy to evaporate water, which is subsequently condensed and discharged as clean distilled water.

Assembly of the components began in November 2012 and the Brine Concentrator is expected to be commissioned and fully operational in Q3 2013. The Brine Concentrator has the capacity to produce 1.83 gigalitres of clean water per year through the treatment of process water. Hatch was appointed EPCM contractor for the Brine Concentrator project. It was successfully commissioned in November 2013 with a budget of AUD $220 Million dollars.

In 2012, ERA and the Mirarr Traditional Owners represented by the Gundjeihmi Aboriginal Corporation (GAC), conducted a jointly facilitated independent expert review of the quality of surface water around the Ranger Project Area. The Independent Surface Water Working Group consisted of representatives from ERA, GAC, the Supervising Scientists Division and the Northern Land Council.

Over a six-month period, the working group examined the impacts, monitoring and reporting of surface water flowing from the Ranger mine.

The working group agreed in findings released in March 2013 that the current surface water management and regulatory systems in place at the Ranger mine are of a very high standard.
Going forward, the Group has agreed upon an action plan to ensure that surface water management systems at Ranger remain best leading practice.

Safety breaches and controversy
Environment Australia (an agency of the Government of Australia) have documented over 200 environmental incidents since 1979.  The great majority of these were minor, but the significant ones are detailed below. In 2013, a spokesperson from the Public Health Association of Australia claimed that there had been a hundred safety incidents linked to the mine in the thirty years prior.

In May 2005 the company was convicted for breaching environmental guidelines - the first such prosecution of a mining company in the Northern Territory, relating to accidental radiological exposure to ERA employees. Radioactively contaminated process water had entered the drinking water supply and some workers drank and washed in it. Dozens of mine employees were found to have showered in and consumed water containing 400 times the legal limit of uranium. The maximum radiation exposure of workers was likely to have been much less than the regulatory limit, and no harmful long-term health effects are likely.

Other incidents involving decontamination of vehicles have been identified. When the work-for-welfare mechanic in Jabiru opened the engine bay, he was unaware of the nature of the mud and dirt which fell on the floor. The court heard that in the following weeks, after he had swept the material outside his shed, his children played and built sandcastles in mud contaminated with uranium.

Another significant controversy over Ranger's environmental impact is the public legal confrontation over releases into Magela Creek in the 1995 wet season. More recently, the ARRAC report from 2002 details a major leak of about 2 megalitres of potentially polluted water, over a number of months.

In 2007, water breached a retention pond, overflowing back into the pit. The original authorisation required that this water be contained at all times. In 2006, water management systems were disrupted by Cyclone Monica.

In May 2010, it was reported that a tailings dam may have released millions of litres of radioactive water into world heritage-listed wetlands in Kakadu National Park, home to about 500 Aboriginal people.

In November 2013, four drums previously used to transport yellowcake were found in a rural area of Darwin. The company recovered the drums amid concerns about the potential spread of radioactive contamination.

On 7 December 2013 there was an incident at a mine site inside Kakadu National Park, with about a million litres of slurry, comprising crushed ore and acid, believed spilled, workers evacuated and production shut down. A leaching tank containing the slurry burst at about 1am. The spilled material was entirely contained within the safety bunds and no material leaked into the wider ecosystem.

See also 
 McArthur River uranium mine in the Athabasca Basin in Saskatchewan Canada
 List of uranium mines
 Unconformity uranium deposits
 Uranium mining
 Uranium market
 Uranium mining in Australia
 Russell Walter Fox

References

 IAEA, 1980. URANIUM IN THE PINE CREEK GEOSYNCLINE (Eds J Ferguson and A B Goleby). Proceedings of the international symposium on the Pine Creek Geosyncline, Int. Atomic Energy Agency, Sydney, Australia, 4–8 June 1979.

External links

 Energy Resources of Australia
 collection of news articles and media releases about Ranger Uranium Mine
 Ranger uranium mine life pushed to 2012

1980 establishments in Australia
Mines in the Northern Territory
Open-pit mines
Rio Tinto (corporation) subsidiaries
Surface mines in Australia
Uranium mines in the Northern Territory